Achrekar is a surname. Notable people with the surname include:

Bharati Achrekar (born 1957), Indian actress
Ramakant Achrekar (1932–2019), Indian cricket coach

Indian surnames